Abdullah Al-Jadaani (born March 6, 1991), is a Saudi Arabian professional footballer who currently plays as a goalkeeper for Al-Ittihad.

Career
Al-Jadaani started his career at Al-Ahli and signed his first professional contract with the club on 25 July 2012. On 10 September 2013, Al-Jadaani was loaned out to Al-Raed. He made his debut on 3 December 2013 in the Crown Prince Cup match against Hetten. On 13 June 2014, Al-Jadaani joined Najran on a two-year contract. He made his league debut on 11 March 2015 against his former club Al-Ahli. On 7 June 2016, Al-Jadaani joined First Division Damac. After a year with Damac, Al-Jadaani left and signed for Pro League side Ohod.

On 12 June 2017, the Saudi FF announced that foreign goalkeepers would be allowed to play in the Pro League for the first time in history. On 30 June 2017, Ohod announced that they had signed Algerian international Azzedine Doukha. On the same day Al-Jadaani left Ohod and joined Al-Wehda to seek first team football. In his first season at the club, Al-Jadaani made 28 appearances as Al-Wehda achieved promotion to the Pro League at the first time of asking. In his second season, his role was reduced to back-up goalkeeper following the arrival of Egyptian international Mohamed Awad. He made 5 appearances in all competitions. In his third season at the club, he established himself as the first-choice goalkeeper and made 22 appearances in all competitions and kept 7 clean sheets.

On 31 January 2020, Al-Jadaani signed a pre-contract agreement with Al-Hilal and joined the club on a free transfer. He officially joined the club following the conclusion of the 2019–20 season. On 3 December 2020, Al-Jadaani made his debut and kept a clean sheet for Al-Hilal in the 3–0 win against Al-Fateh. Al-Jadaani would then start the next two league games which included a 1–0 win against Al-Raed and a 2-1 defeat to former club Al-Wehda. On 17 December 2020, Al-Jadaani made his final appearance for Al-Hilal, in a 2–0 defeat to Al-Fateh in the round of 16 of the King Cup.

On 29 August 2022, Al-Jadaani joined Al-Ittihad on a free transfer.

Career statistics

Club

Honours
Al-Wehda
MS League: 2017–18

Al-Hilal
Saudi Professional League: 2020–21, 2021–22
King Cup: 2019–20
AFC Champions League: 2021
Saudi Super Cup: 2021

Al-Ittihad
Saudi Super Cup: 2022

References

External links 
 

Living people
1991 births
Saudi Arabian footballers
Al-Ahli Saudi FC players
Al-Raed FC players
Najran SC players
Damac FC players
Al-Wehda Club (Mecca) players
Al Hilal SFC players
Ittihad FC players
Saudi First Division League players
Saudi Professional League players
Association football goalkeepers